The 2008 Gerry Weber Open was a men's tennis tournament played on outdoor grass courts. It was the 16th edition of the Gerry Weber Open, and was part of the International Series of the 2008 ATP Tour. It took place at the Gerry Weber Stadion in Halle, North Rhine-Westphalia, Germany, from 7 June through 15 June 2008.

The singles draw featured World No. 1, French Open runner-up and 2003, 2004, 2005 and 2006 Halle champion Roger Federer, ATP No. 7, Delray Beach and Houston finalist James Blake, and defending champion Tomáš Berdych. Also present were Australian Open quarterfinalist and Chennai titlist Mikhail Youzhny, 2007 Halle runner-up Marcos Baghdatis, Radek Štěpánek, Jarkko Nieminen and Ivan Ljubičić.

First-seeded Roger Federer won the singles title.

Finals

Singles

 Roger Federer defeated  Philipp Kohlschreiber, 6–3, 6–4
 It was Federer's 2nd title of the year, and the 55th of his career. It was his 5th win at the event, and one he accomplished without dropping serve once throughout the entire tournament.

Doubles

 Mikhail Youzhny /  Mischa Zverev defeated  Lukáš Dlouhý /  Leander Paes, 3–6, 6–4, [10–3]
 It was Youzhny's first title of the year and the 8th of his career. It was Zverev's first career title.

External links
 Official website
 Singles draw
 Doubles draw
 Qualifying Singles draw